Stauropolia is an extinct genus of tiger moths in the family Erebidae. The genus includes one extinct species, Stauropolia nekrutenkoi, which lived during the Miocene epoch in Caucasus.

References
Natural History Museum Lepidoptera generic names catalog

Fossil Lepidoptera
†
Miocene insects
Fossils of Russia
Fossil taxa described in 1988
†